The Battle of Magierów took place on 11 July 1657, during the period in Polish history known as the Swedish Deluge. Polish army commanded by Stefan Czarniecki, and supported by Crimean Tatars, defeated a Transilvanian-Cossack-Moldavian-Wallachian army of George II Rákóczi.

Background 
In late January 1657, following the Treaty of Radnot, southern provinces of the Polish–Lithuanian Commonwealth were invaded by the Principality of Transylvania, whose army was commanded by George II Rákóczi. In mid-February near Medyka, the 25,000 Transilvanians joined 10,000 Zaporozhian Cossacks under Anton Zdanowicz. By March 1657, Rakoczi reached Swedish-occupied Kraków, in April, he met Swedish King Charles X Gustav, in May, he captured the city of Brest, and by late June, he was in Warsaw. Rakoczi’s campaign was marked by widespread looting, murder and destruction.

In June 1657, the Dano-Swedish War (1657–58) broke out, which forced Charles Gustav to move most of his army to Denmark. Under the circumstances, the Rakoczi decided to march southwards, and leave the Commonwealth as soon as possible. Polish King John II Casimir of the Royal Vasa Dynasty was well aware of it, and decided to prevent the Transilvanians, Moldovans, Wallachians and Cossacks from escaping Poland. King John II Casimir called Stefan Czarniecki to come with his division to Częstochowa, where he was joined by Austrian cavalry mercenaries, Lithuanians of Aleksander Hilary Polubiński, and a unit of Crimean Tatars. On 7 July Czarniecki’s division reached Łańcut, where a council of Polish hetmans took place. Czarniecki then followed Rakoczi, while Jerzy Sebastian Lubomirski and Stanisław "Rewera" Potocki sealed the Polish - Transilvanian border.

The battle
After the meeting, Czarniecki with an army of 10,000 followed Rakoczi, attacking his troops in a guerilla style-war, typical of the Polish hetman. On 11 July Czarniecki attacked the Transilvanians, near the village of Magierów, north of Lwów. After a Polish attack, the Transilvanians retreated towards Żółkiew, leaving behind some 2,000 wagons with goods looted in Poland. Soon afterwards, Poles ambushed the enemy in the swampy waterbed of the Poltva River. Hundreds of Hungarians drowned, and the survivors continued their retreat southwards.

Sources 

Magierow
Conflicts in 1657